Roy Ironside (born 28 May 1935) is a former professional footballer who played in The Football League for Rotherham United and Barnsley. 

Ironside was a member of Rotherham's 1961 Football League Cup Final team. His son is Ian Ironside a retired professional footballer also a goalkeeper and his grandson is Joe Ironside who is currently a striker for cambridge united

References

English footballers
Barnsley F.C. players
Rotherham United F.C. players
English Football League players
1935 births
Living people
Association football goalkeepers